= Brigida Bianchi =

Italian stage actress

Brigida Bianchi (1613–1703) was an Italian stage actress.

Bianchi - whose maiden name was most likely Fedele - was born in Servigliano. By the 1630s, she had become a performer, appearing in records of theatre troupes. In She was an actress in the Royal Italian court theatre in Paris between 1640 and 1660 and was a favorite of Anne of Austria.

== Works ==
- L'inganno fortunato, overo l'amata aborrita, comedia bellissima transportata dallo spagnuolo con alcune poesie musicali composte in diversi tempi (Paris, 1659), play
- I rifiuti di Pindo (Paris 1666), composition
